Lenora Fisher (born 6 January 1937) is a Canadian former backstroke and freestyle swimmer. She competed at the 1952 Summer Olympics and the 1956 Summer Olympics.

References

External links
 

1937 births
Living people
Canadian female backstroke swimmers
Canadian female freestyle swimmers
Olympic swimmers of Canada
Swimmers at the 1952 Summer Olympics
Swimmers at the 1956 Summer Olympics
Place of birth missing (living people)
Pan American Games medalists in swimming
Pan American Games gold medalists for Canada
Pan American Games silver medalists for Canada
Swimmers at the 1955 Pan American Games
Medalists at the 1955 Pan American Games
20th-century Canadian women
21st-century Canadian women